The men's 5000 metres event at the 1989 Summer Universiade was held at the Wedaustadion in Duisburg on 28 and 30 August 1989.

Medalists

Results

Heats

Final

References

Athletics at the 1989 Summer Universiade
1989